Ellendale State Forest Picnic Facility, also known as CCC Picnic Area/S-8151, is a historic picnic facility located at Ellendale, Sussex County, Delaware.  It was built in 1938-1939 by the Civilian Conservation Corps and designed to serve as a road-side rest facility for tourists and long-distance travelers on the DuPont Boulevard.  It consists of three buildings and three structures.  The largest of these is a 20 feet, 10 inch, square pyramidal-roofed log pavilion. Also on the property are two wood gable-roofed picnic tables shelters, a fieldstone trash pit, fieldstone fireplace hearth, and foundation and water pipe for a fountain.

It was added to the National Register of Historic Places in 1991.

References

Park buildings and structures on the National Register of Historic Places in Delaware
Buildings and structures completed in 1939
Buildings and structures in Sussex County, Delaware
National Register of Historic Places in Sussex County, Delaware
Picnic shelters